{{distinguish |text=the British architect Peter James Carter (1927–2017), author of Mies van der Rohe at Work (van der Rohe at WorldCat) }}
 

Peter Carter (13 August 1929 – 21 July 1999) was a British writer of children's books, primarily historical novels. He won several awards: the Guardian Prize, two Young Observer Prizes, and the German Preis der Leseratten. His books were shortlisted for many more prizes, and were translated into at least six languages, from Japanese to Portuguese.

Life

Carter was born in Manchester, one of eight children. He left school at 14 and later took evening classes in art and philosophy, before entering Wadham College, Oxford at age 30. There he received the M.A. in English Literature in 1962. He was a school teacher from 1963 to 1976 and then a full-time writer until his death in 1999 from abdominal hæmorrhage, suffered while writing at home in Warwick. Carter's first wife Lois Wilkinson died after one year, during his time at Oxford. He later married Gudrun Willege, a German photographer —or Ulrike Willige— and moved to Hamburg, Germany, in 1976. Later they divorced and remarried; he moved or visited back and forth. He married four times in all (one stepson).

Carter won Guardian Children's Fiction Prize for The Sentinels, published by Oxford University Press in 1981. The annual book award is judged by a panel of British children's writers and recognises the year's best book by an author who has not yet won it. Carter's Children of the Book (1982) is a historical novel about the 1683 Siege of Vienna.

For Under Goliath (Oxford, 1977) he was a commended runner-up for the Carnegie Medal from the Library Association, recognising the year's best children's book by a British subject.

 Works 

All of Carter's books were published by Oxford University Press.
  The Black Lamp (1973), illustrated by David Harris 
  The Gates of Paradise (1974), illus. Fermin Rocker 
  Madatan (1974), illus. Victor Ambrus 
  Mao (1976), a biography 
  Under Goliath (1977) —commended for the Carnegie Medal
  The Sentinels (1980) —winner of the Guardian Prize and the Premio Europeo di Letteratura Giovanile
  Children of the Book (1982) —winner of the Young Observer/Rank Organisation Fiction prize and the Preis der Leseratten
  Captain Teachum's Buried Treasure (1989), illus. Korky Paul, who made the Greenaway Medal shortlist
  Bury the Dead (1987) —winner of the Young Observer Teenage Fiction award
  Leaving Cheyenne (1990); U.S. title, Borderlands  The Hunted (1993)
  Fairy Tales from Grimm'' retold by Carter (Oxford, 1999)

See also

Notes

References

External links 
 Peter Carter at Library of Congress Authorities – with 11 catalogue records

WARNING: WorldCat conflates at least two distinct writers named Peter Carter. See the header far above.

1929 births
1999 deaths
British children's writers
British historical novelists
Guardian Children's Fiction Prize winners
20th-century British novelists
Writers of historical fiction set in the early modern period